Twin Prime Search (TPS) is a volunteer computing project that looks for large twin primes. It uses the programs LLR (for primality testing) and NewPGen (for sieving). It was founded on April 13, 2006, by Michael Kwok. It is unknown whether there are infinitely many twin primes.

Progress
TPS found a record twin prime, 2003663613 × 2195000 ± 1, on January 15, 2007, on a computer operated by Eric Vautier. It is 58,711 digits long, which made it the largest known twin prime at the time. The project worked in collaboration with PrimeGrid, which did most of the LLR tests.

On August 6, 2009, those same two projects announced that a new record twin prime had been found. The primes are 65516468355 × 2333333 ± 1, and have 100,355 digits. The smaller of the two primes is also the largest known Chen prime as of August 2009.

On December 25, 2011, Timothy D Winslow found the world's largest known twin primes 3756801695685 × 2666669 ± 1 (official announcement: http://www.primegrid.com/download/twin-666669.pdf ).

, the current largest twin prime pair known is 2996863034895 · 21290000 ± 1, with 388,342 decimal digits.  It was discovered on September 14, 2016.

The decimal representations of the first two primes listed above are at http://4unitmaths.com/tp1.pdf and http://4unitmaths.com/tp2.pdf .

Current efforts
TPS has three sub-projects : A search for k × 2390000 ± 1, a variable twin search to find twins between 144,500 and 150,500 digits, and a search called Operation Megabit Twin for k × 21,000,000 ± 1.

See also
 List of volunteer computing projects
 PrimeGrid

References

External links
 
 Twin Prime Search forum

Volunteer computing projects
Distributed prime searches